Moridhal College is located in Moridhal, Dhemaji, Assam near National Highway 52.

Moridhal College is a co-education institution initially started with Arts Stream only and subsequently, Science Stream was too introduced to cater the needs of Science education of the region i.e. border area of Assam and Arunachal Pradesh. With Higher-Secondary and Bachelor Degree courses in both streams along with different parallel oriented courses with an experienced and efficient teaching staff.

The college offers major (honours) courses almost in all customary subjects in the Arts and Science stream.

Courses

Presently the college offers following courses. 
 Higher Secondary (Arts and Science)
 Bachelor degree (Arts and Science)

The College also offers the different courses of Institute of Distance and Open Learning (IDOL) Gauhati University, Directorate of Distance Education (DDE) Dibrugarh University, IGNOU in the respective study centers of the open Universities in the college.

Educational Departments

Arts:
  English Department
 Anthropology Department
  Assamese Department
 Education Department
 Economics Department
 History Department
 Hindi Department
 Political Science Department
 Philosophy Department
 Mathematics Department
 Geography Department
 Sociology Department

Science:
 Anthropology Department
 Botany Department
 Zoology Department
 Chemistry Department
 Physics Department
 Electronics Department
 Geography Department
 Computer Science Department
 Economics Department
 Statistics Department
 Mathematics Department

See also 

 List of accredited colleges in Assam

Dhemaji
Universities and colleges in Assam
Colleges affiliated to Dibrugarh University
Educational institutions established in 1988
1988 establishments in Assam